Bradley Alan Wood (born 2 September 1991) is an English footballer who played as a right back.

He began his career at Grimsby Town where he was also used as a left back and winger. At international level he has represented England C. He later moved on to Alfreton before joining Lincoln City. He was part of the Imps side that won the National League and reached the FA Cup quarter final during the 2016–17 season. He is currently serving a six-year ban from all football activity, expiring on 8 March 2024, for match fixing.

Club career

Grimsby Town
Bradley Wood is a combative player who was promoted to the club's first team squad midway through the 2008–09 season as a makeshift defender from the youth team. He was named as a substitute once for The Mariners. In the 2009–10 season, Wood did not receive a squad number until his club fell victim to an injury crisis which saw him named as a substitute in the away defeat against Port Vale. On 26 September Wood made his first team debut playing from the start against Darlington in place of regular right back Robbie Stockdale. The match finished 1–1 with Wood putting in a very impressive debut at right back and winning Man of the Match. Wood continued this role filling in for the injured Stockdale, and also played as a makeshift left back in the place of Joe Widdowson on the odd occasion.

On 16 October Wood signed a 4-year professional contract with Grimsby. He popped up with a vital injury time assist in the 2–2 draw with Accrington Stanley on 30 October when his long ball assisted a Barry Conlon 95th-minute equaliser. At the time he was playing as an emergency centre back following the sending off of defender Olly Lancashire.

On 3 May 2010, Wood scored the winning goal for Grimsby Towns youth team in a 1–0 win over Shrewsbury Town's youth team in the Midland Floodlit Youth cup final. Wood was named Grimsby Town supporters Young Player of the Year for the 2010–11 season.

During the 2012–13 season Wood was ever present as the club missed out on lifting the FA Trophy at Wembley Stadium and despite leading the Conference for the majority of the season Town were to lose out in the play-offs to Newport County. Wood was released by Town on 2 May 2013, at the time he had been the club's current longest serving player. He bowed out of Grimsby having made 113 league appearances, scoring 1 goal.

Alfreton Town
On 28 May 2013 it was announced that Wood had signed for Alfreton Town on a one-year contract. He made his debut in the 1–0 defeat to Dartford on the opening day of the season and scored his first goal at the end of September in a defeat to Braintree Town. After featuring in 49 of Alfreton's 50 games in 2013–14 he was named as the Supporters Player of the Season and the following month signed a new two-year contract, keeping him at the club until 2016.

Lincoln City
He signed a 2-year contract at Lincoln City for the start of the 2015–16 season. Wood was voted as Lincoln's "Player of the Season" during his first season at the club. During the 2016–17 season Wood played a pivotal role in the Imps reaching the FA Cup quarter final which resulted in a 5–0 defeat to Arsenal. Lincoln would also secure a return to the Football League after being crowned National League champions. Towards the end of the season Wood was convicted of drink driving offence and although he wasn't officially announced as being released, he was not featured in the retained list.

Return to Alfreton Town
He returned to Alfreton Town in August 2017. On 19 April 2018, Wood received a six-year ban from all football activity by the Football Association for match fixing. This is due to expire on 8 March 2024.

International career
Wood made his debut for England C in September 2013, coming off the bench in a 1–0 defeat to Latvia under-23s. He was called into the squad again the following year for the game against Jordan under-23s.

Personal life
In February 2017 Wood was banned from driving for 12 months after being convicted of drink driving. In July 2017 he was caught driving whilst on his ban.

Wood pleaded guilty to assault following an incident at North Kesteven Leisure Centre in North Hykeham in August 2017, he was fined £154 and ordered to pay £100 compensation and a victim surcharge of £30.

On 19 April 2018 Wood was handed a six-year suspension from all football activity by the Football Association. A tribunal found that Wood had deliberately been booked whilst playing for Lincoln City in their FA Cup victories over Ipswich Town and Burnley during the 2016–17 season. Betting companies said that seven people had placed unusual bets on Wood being booked in both games, two of which were found to be close friends of Wood's. He also admitted 22 charges of betting on games himself.

Career statistics

Honours
Grimsby Town
Young Player of the Year: 2010–11

Alfreton Town
Supporters Player of the Year: 2013–14

Lincoln City
National League: 2016–17
Player of the Year: 2015–16

References

External links
Bradley Wood profile at Alfreton Town F.C.

1991 births
Living people
Footballers from Leicester
English footballers
England semi-pro international footballers
Association football defenders
Grimsby Town F.C. players
Alfreton Town F.C. players
English Football League players
National League (English football) players
Lincoln City F.C. players
Association football controversies
Sportspeople convicted of crimes